Castillo Club de Fútbol is a Spanish football team based in Castillo del Romeral, San Bartolomé de Tirajana, Gran Canaria, in the autonomous community of Canary Islands. Founded in 1950, it plays in Primera de Aficionados, holding home games at Estadio Municipal de Castillo del Romeral, with a capacity of 1,000.

History
In 1999, after playing nearly 50 years in the regional leagues, Castillo reached the fourth division. There, it achieved four consecutive top-five finishes, qualifying three times for the playoffs, albeit without promotion, before finally making it to the third level in 2004, remaining in the category for two seasons.

In July 2010, Castillo was forced to drop down to Preferente, due to serious financial problems.

Season to season

2 seasons in Segunda División B
9 seasons in Tercera División

Notable players
 Pablo Paz
 Víctor Afonso
 Axier Intxaurraga
 Andoni Lakabeg
 Santi Lampón
 Javi Ortega
 Antonio Robaina
 Francis Suárez
 Sergio Suárez
 Daniel Visconti
 Luis Miguel Reyes

References

External links
Official website 

Football clubs in the Canary Islands
Association football clubs established in 1950
Sport in Gran Canaria
Divisiones Regionales de Fútbol clubs
1950 establishments in Spain